Simona Halep defeated Elena Bogdan in the final, 6–4, 6–7(3–7), 6–2 to win the girls' singles tennis title at the 2008 French Open. Halep would go on to win the women's title for her maiden major title ten years later.

Alizé Cornet was the reigning champion, but did not compete in the juniors that year.

Seeds

Draw

Finals

Top half

Section 1

Section 2

Bottom half

Section 3

Section 4

References

External links 
 Draw
 Qualifying draw

Girls' Singles
French Open, 2008 Girls' Singles